Helstroff (Lorraine Franconian: Helschtroff) is a commune in the Moselle department in Grand Est in north-eastern France.

The locality of Macker (a.k.a. Macher) is incorporated in the commune since 1811.

See also
 Communes of the Moselle department

References

External links
 

Communes of Moselle (department)